Chili is an unincorporated community and census-designated place in Rio Arriba County, New Mexico. Its population was 654 as of the 2010 census. U.S. Route 84 passes through the community. The name comes from a station of the D&RG railroad that was known locally as the "Chili Line."

Geography

The Rio del Oso flows by or through Chili, within its zip code 87537, where it crosses under U.S. Route 84, and forms part of the northwest boundary of this zip code region. The Rio Chama forms the northeast boundary of this zip code region.

Demographics

Education
Chili is served by Española Public Schools. The comprehensive public high school is Española Valley High School.

References

Census-designated places in New Mexico
Census-designated places in Rio Arriba County, New Mexico